Tina Lindsay is a former England women's international footballer.  Lindsay greatest achievement was winning the 1997 FA Women's Cup Final with Millwall.

Honours
Millwall
 FA Women's Cup: 1997

References

Living people
FA Women's National League players
Millwall Lionesses L.F.C. players
English women's footballers
England women's international footballers
Women's association football midfielders
Year of birth missing (living people)